T. F. O'Higgins may refer to:

 Thomas F. O'Higgins (1890–1953) Fine Gael politician
 Tom O'Higgins (1916–2003) Fine Gael politician, Chief Justice